Christine Josephine Cavanaugh (née Sandberg; August 16, 1963 – December 22, 2014) was an American actress, who had a distinctive speaking style and provided the voice for a large range of cartoon characters. She was the original voice of Chuckie Finster in Nickelodeon's Rugrats and the voices of Gosalyn Mallard in Darkwing Duck, Bunnie Rabbot from the Sonic the Hedgehog Saturday-morning cartoon on ABC, Oblina in Aaahh!!! Real Monsters and the title characters from Babe and Cartoon Network's Dexter's Laboratory.

Cavanaugh retired from voice acting and public life in general in 2001, although some media with her contributions continued to be released until 2003. She died at age 51 on December 22, 2014, at her home in Cedar City, Utah.

Early life
Christine Josephine Sandberg was born in Layton, Utah, on August 16, 1963, to Waldo Eugene Sandberg and Rheta Sandberg (née Mason). Cavanaugh was a member of the Church of Jesus Christ of Latter-day Saints.

Career
In 1991, Cavanaugh voiced Gosalyn Mallard, the title character's adopted daughter on Disney's Darkwing Duck as well as Chuckie Finster on the Nickelodeon cartoon Rugrats, and later in 1994, Oblina on Aaahh!!! Real Monsters.

Cavanaugh could also be heard on The Critic as the voice of Marty, Jay Sherman's son. Her voice credits also include the animated series Sonic the Hedgehog, 101 Dalmatians: The Series, Hercules: The Animated Series, The Powerpuff Girls, The Wild Thornberrys, and Recess, as well as the voice of Birdie in The Wacky Adventures of Ronald McDonald. In the early 1990s, Cavanaugh also served as an announcer for The Disney Channel for "coming up next" bumpers.

In 1995, Cavanaugh lent her voice to the live-action film Babe in the starring role of Babe the Gallant Pig. She was offered to reprise her role for the sequel, Babe: Pig in the City, but decided against it when contract negotiations fell through, so the role was instead played by her Rugrats co-star Elizabeth Daily. Also in 1995, Cavanaugh started doing the voice of boy-genius Dexter on Dexter's Laboratory, which began as a short under Cartoon Network's What a Cartoon! show, and later became the first short to be adapted into its own series for Cartoon Network. She later won an Annie Award in 2000 for her voice performance as Dexter in the hour-long TV special Dexter's Laboratory: Ego Trip.

Cavanaugh also guest starred on several TV shows including Salute Your Shorts, Cheers, Empty Nest, Wings, The X-Files, Everybody Loves Raymond, and ER, and had supporting roles in the feature films Soulmates and Jerry Maguire. Cavanaugh retired from voice acting in 2001 to spend more time with family, although some TV episodes and films with her recordings continued to be released until 2003. After her retirement, she was replaced by Candi Milo as the voice of Dexter and by Nancy Cartwright, her co-star in The Critic, as the voice of Chuckie in Rugrats.

Death
On December 22, 2014, Cavanaugh died of chronic myelogenous leukemia at her home in Cedar City, Utah. She was 51 years old. She was cremated and her ashes scattered into the Great Salt Lake.

Filmography

Voice roles

Live-action

References

External links

Christine Cavanaugh profile  at Voice Chasers
Christine Cavanaugh Obituary – Los Angeles Times

1963 births
2014 deaths
20th-century American actresses
21st-century American actresses
Actresses from Utah
American film actresses
American television actresses
American video game actresses
American voice actresses
Annie Award winners
Deaths from cancer in the United States
Latter Day Saints from Utah
University of Hawaiʻi at Mānoa alumni
Utah State University alumni